The South Fork Bull Run River is a tributary, about  long, of the Bull Run River in the U.S. state of Oregon. Part of the system that provides drinking water to the city of Portland, it flows generally west through a protected part of the Mount Hood National Forest in Clackamas County.

Course
The river, which begins in Township Meadow in the Mount Hood National Forest, flows northwest and then west through Clackamas County and the Mount Hood National Forest. It receives its only named tributary, Cedar Creek, from the right before reaching a United States Geological Survey (USGS) stream gauge  from the mouth. The South Fork joins the main stem Bull Run River at the larger stream's  river mile (RM) 8 or river kilometer (RK) 13, near the midpoint of Bull Run Reservoir 2.

Discharge
Since 1974, the USGS has monitored the flow of the South Fork Bull Run River at a stream gauge  from the mouth.

Watershed
The Bull Run River watershed, which includes the South Fork Bull Run River, drains . The basin, which is the main source of Portland's drinking water, is largely restricted to uses related to water collection, storage, treatment, and forest management. The South Fork Bull Run River basin of about  amounts to about 11 percent of the total Bull Run River watershed, which is managed by the Portland Water Bureau and the United States Forest Service.

See also
List of rivers of Oregon
Bull Run National Forest

References

Works cited
McArthur, Lewis A., and McArthur, Lewis L. (2003) [1928]. Oregon Geographic Names, 4th edition. Portland: Oregon Historical Society Press. .
Portland Water Bureau (2007). "Landscape Conditions", Chapter 4 of Current Habitat Conditions in the  Habitat Conservation Plan Area. Portland, Oregon: Portland Water Bureau. Retrieved March 9, 2010.

External links
Sandy River Basin Watershed Council
Sandy River Basin Partners
Forest Service, Mount Hood National Forest

Rivers of Oregon
Rivers of Clackamas County, Oregon
Mount Hood National Forest